Adultery Tree is a 1985 South Korean film directed by Jung Jin-woo. It was awarded Best Film at the Grand Bell Awards ceremony.

Synopsis
In this historical drama, the matriarch of an aristocratic family makes the lady Yeon-ji's life miserable due to her inability to bear children. The matriarch brings a surrogate mother into the family, and orders Yeon-ji to kill herself. Yeon-ji hangs herself at the hanging tree used for women who have engaged in adultery.

Cast
 Won Mi-kyung
 Kim Yong-seon
 Park Jung-ja
 Kim Hee-ra
 Jeon Moo-song
 Choe Byeong-geun
 Hong Seong-min
 Lim Hae-lim
 Choe Jae-ho
 Park Jong-sel

References

External links 
 
 
 
 
 

1985 films
Best Picture Grand Bell Award winners
1980s Korean-language films
South Korean historical drama films
Films directed by Jung Jin-woo
1980s historical drama films